Top of the Lake is a mystery drama television series created and written by Jane Campion and Gerard Lee, and directed by Campion and Garth Davis. It aired in 2013, and the sequel, entitled Top of the Lake: China Girl, in 2017. It marks Campion's first work for television since An Angel at My Table in 1990.

Series 1 follows Detective Robin Griffin (Elisabeth Moss) and deals with her investigation of the disappearance of a pregnant 12-year-old girl in New Zealand. Series 2, China Girl, is set in Sydney five years later, as Detective Griffin investigates the death of an unidentified Asian girl found at Bondi Beach.

Top of the Lake was co-produced for BBC Two in the UK, BBC UKTV in Australia and New Zealand, and Sundance Channel in the United States. It has been generally very well received.

Cast 
Elisabeth Moss plays the central role of Robin Griffin, a Sydney detective specializing in sexual assault, in both series. Additional cast members are as follows:

Top of the Lake

Main 
 David Wenham as Al Parker, an old-school and well-liked detective sergeant, based in Queenstown, who also manages a café where young offenders are given a second chance.
 Peter Mullan as Matt Mitcham, a Scotsman and head of the Mitcham family. He is the informal leader of the town, feared by the townspeople, but with a complex inner life.
 Tom Wright as Johnno Mitcham, Matt's estranged youngest son, and Robin's teenage sweetheart. He recently returned to Laketop after serving eight years in Bangkwang, a Thai prison, for drug possession.
 Holly Hunter as GJ, an androgynous Swiss spiritual leader, arriving at Paradise with a group of troubled women, who hope GJ and Laketop will help them rediscover themselves.

Supporting 
 Kip Chapman and Jay Ryan as Luke and Mark Mitcham, Matt's brute sons.
 Jacqueline Joe as Tui Angel Mitcham, Matt's 12-year-old daughter who disappears after it is discovered that she is five months pregnant.
 Robyn Nevin as Jude Griffin, Robin's mother, who is suffering from cancer.
 Calvin Tuteao as Turangi, Jude's Māori boyfriend, who has a violent temper.

 GJ's community 
 Matt's men 
 Tui's friends 
 The Southern Lakes Police Department 
 Residents of Laketop

Top of the Lake: China Girl

Main 
 Gwendoline Christie as Miranda Hilmarson, a 35-year-old constable in the Sydney Police Force, who becomes Robin's partner.
 David Dencik as Alexander "Puss" Braun, a 42-year-old charismatic German, who owns a building in Sydney he rents to a brothel. He is also Mary's boyfriend. Puss's grooming of Mary frightens Robin, Pyke and Julia.
 Ewen Leslie as Pyke Edwards, a successful lawyer and Mary's adoptive father. Mary resents him for his passivity in his relationship with Julia.
 Alice Englert as Mary Edwards, Robin's 17-year-old daughter, whom she gave up for adoption at two days old. Suffering from anxiety and low self-esteem, Mary has begun to act out, due to the separation of her parents.
 Nicole Kidman as Julia Edwards, Mary's overbearing adoptive mother. She has recently become estranged from her husband and daughter, due to having an affair with a female teacher from Mary's school, with whom she now lives.

Supporting 
Clayton Jacobson as Detective Sergeant Adrian Butler, Robin's boss.
Kym Gyngell as Bootie, who owns the Silk 41 brothel in Sydney, in space rented from Puss.
Ling Cooper Tang as Dang, Bootie's Thai-born wife and madam of the brothel.
Geoff Morrell as Ray, the police pathologist.
Liv Hewson as Michaela, Mary's best friend at school.
Christiaan Van Vuuren as Stally, a police constable interested in Robin.
Lincoln Vickery, as Brett Iles, a young computer science student in love with a missing brothel worker, Cinnamon.
David Wenham returns as Al in one episode. Kip Chapman, Jacqueline Joe, Byron Coll and Cohen Holloway also reprise their Top of the Lake roles in a flashback sequence, with Mark Leonard Winter appearing as Johnno.

Production

Top of the Lake 
Jane Campion originally offered the role of Robin to Anna Paquin, who had worked with her on The Piano (1993), but she declined due to her pregnancy. The role then went to American Elisabeth Moss.

The series was originally intended as a co-production with the Australian Broadcasting Corporation. But after Moss was cast as Robin, the network pulled their funding before production began, citing a prior agreement to put an Australian actress in the lead. Australian-based channel UKTV, owned by BBC Worldwide, filled the funding gap left by the ABC. Philippa Campbell was the New Zealand-based producer.

Filming took 18 weeks and was shot entirely on location in Queenstown and Glenorchy, in Otago, on the South Island of New Zealand. While Queenstown is referred to during the series, Glenorchy doubles as the fictitious town of Laketop. The scenes in the women's commune were filmed at Moke Lake.

Top of the Lake: China Girl 
In early 2013, co-creator Jane Campion said that Top of the Lake comes to a distinct ending, and there would be no additional series. Despite this, it was announced in October 2014 that the series had been renewed for a second season. China Girl began shooting on location in Sydney in December 2015.

Campion returned as co-writer and co-director. Gerard Lee returned as co-writer. The original co-director, Garth Davis, was replaced by Ariel Kleiman due to scheduling conflicts. Philippa Campbell returned as producer. Actress Nicole Kidman joined the cast for China Girl, which is the second time she has worked with Campion. Kidman "plays an Australian mother, Julia, whose story dovetails with that of Detective Robin Griffin", played by Elisabeth Moss. Gwendoline Christie, a fan of Campion's The Piano, joined the cast in a role written especially for her after sending a letter through a mutual friend.

Release
Top of the Lake screened in its entirety at the January 2013 Sundance Film Festival, in a single seven-hour session with one intermission and a break for lunch. This was the first such screening in the history of the festival. Top of the Lake was additionally shown at the 63rd Berlin International Film Festival.

The US premiere was on the Sundance Channel on 18 March 2013, in Australia on BBC UKTV on 24 March 2013, and in New Zealand on 25 March, also on BBC UKTV.

China Girl was screened in its entirety at the May 2017 Cannes Film Festival. In the UK, it premiered on BBC Two on 27 July 2017. In the US, it premiered in September 2017, on Sundance TV, and each episode will be available on Hulu the day after its screening on SundanceTV. In Canada, China Girl premiered on 25 October 2017, on CBC Television.

Episodes

Series 1

Series 2: China Girl

Reception
Reviews of the first series of Top of the Lake have been positive, referring to it as "masterfully made", "beautiful", "mysterious", "riveting", and "a masterpiece". It received a score of 87 out of 100 from Metacritic and a score of 95% from Rotten Tomatoes.

There were also some less positive reviews. Mike Hale of The New York Times criticized the "elaborately introduced plotlines" and described Tui's disappearance as "less a story element than a metaphor for the kind of armed resistance to male hegemony that constitutes the central idea of Ms Campion’s body of work."

Top of the Lake was praised for exploring rape culture, gender dynamics and the experiences of single women.

China Girl received more mixed reviews, with a score of 73 from Metacritic and 71% from Rotten Tomatoes.

Awards and nominations

AACTA Awards

British Academy Television Craft Awards

Critics' Choice Television Awards

Emmy Awards

Golden Globe Awards

Golden Nymph Awards

Screen Actors Guild Awards

New Zealand Film Awards

Screen Producers Australia Awards

Equity Ensemble Awards

References

External links
Top of the Lake at the SundanceTV
Top of the Lake at the BBC
Top of the Lake: China Girl at the BBC

2013 Australian television series debuts
2017 Australian television series endings
BBC Television shows
Detective television series
English-language television shows
Mystery television series
Rape in television
Television shows filmed in Australia
Television shows filmed in New Zealand
Television shows set in New Zealand